The Coeymans Limestone is a geologic formation in New Jersey. It preserves fossils dating back to the Devonian
period.

See also

 List of fossiliferous stratigraphic units in New Jersey
 Paleontology in New Jersey

References
 

Devonian geology of New Jersey
Devonian geology of New York (state)